A teponaztli  is a type of slit drum used in central Mexico by the Aztecs and related cultures.

Structure

Teponaztli are made of hollow hardwood logs, often fire-hardened. Like most slit drums, teponaztlis have two slits on their topside, cut into the shape of an "H". The resultant strips or tongues are then struck with rubber-head wood mallets, or with deer antlers.  Since the tongues are of different lengths, or carved into different thicknesses, the teponaztli produces 2 different pitches, usually near a third or fourth apart.

Teponaztli were usually decorated with relief carvings of various deities or with abstract designs, and were even carved into the shapes of creatures or humans.  Some of these creatures are open-mouthed, providing increased volume through the hole at the end.  On other drums, a hole was made on the drum's underside.  Teponaztli from the Mixtec culture in what is today south-central Mexico are known for their various battle or mythological scenes carved in relief.

These drums ranged in size from about 1 foot (30 cm) to 4 feet (1.2 metres) long.  The larger teponaztli would be rested upon a supporting frame.  The smaller ones could either be rested on a frame or carried by straps about the shoulders.

Use
Someone who plays a teponaztli is called a teponāzoāni   and teponaztli were used in dances, poetry, celebrations(as shown in the Florentine Codex above) or in warfare as a means of communication.  According to some sources, on important state occasions the blood of sacrificial victims was at times poured into the drum.

Motolinia, a Franciscan friar and chronicler of post-conquest Aztec life, stated that the teponaztli, or as he called it the contrabajos (counterbass), was often played with the huehuetl skin drum to accompany various dances.  In addition to dances, teponaztlis were used to accompanied poetry readings: the notations for the sounds of the drum beats (cuīcatlahtōl ) even at times appear within the poetry itself ("totocoto tototo cototo tiquititi titiqui tiquito").  The word cuīcatlahtōl, meaning "musical note", is formed from the two words cuīcatl    (song) and  tlahtōlli   (word). This solfege-style notation allows reconstruction the rhythms and sounds of the Aztecs.

Strokes
Each drum pattern is written using four syllables: To, Ko, Ti, Ki 

Pitch:

To and Ko: low tones
Ti and Ki: high tones

Beat:

To and Ti: downbeats
Ko and Ki: upbeats

Notes

References
Coe, Michael D. (2002); Mexico: From the Olmecs to the Aztecs, London: Thames and Hudson.
Collier, Simon; Skidmore, Thomas E.; Blakemore, Harold (1992) The Cambridge Encyclopedia of Latin America and the Caribbean, Cambridge World Encyclopedia, Cambridge University Press.
Guggenheim Museum, The Aztec Empire: Catalogue of the Exhibition, Guggenheim Museum, New York.
 
Motolinia, Toribio de Benavente, Historia de los Indios de la Nueva España .
"Teponaztli", in Dictionary of Musical Instruments, University of Michigan School of Information, Cultural Heritage Initiative for Community Outreach, accessed April 2007.
Gabriel Pareyon "El teponaztli en la tradición musical mexica"

External links

Understanding the teponaztli rhythms, with audio files.
Description and photo of an owl-shaped teponaztli at the British Museum.
Description and photo of a Mixtec teponaztli at the British Museum.
Teponaztli audio files.

Slit drums
Mesoamerican musical instruments
Mexican musical instruments
Guatemalan musical instruments
Salvadoran musical instruments
Aztec society